Alaifatu Junior Fatialofa (born 16 December 1980) was born in Wellington, New Zealand

He is a rugby union and played for Wellington Lions in the Air New Zealand NPC

Fatialofa played for Exeter Chiefs from 2004 to 2008 and signed for Bristol Rugby for 2008-2009 Guinness Premiership.

External links
Bristol profile

Living people
1980 births
New Zealand rugby union players
Bristol Bears players
Exeter Chiefs players
Cornish Pirates players
Rugby union centres